Pariguana (meaning "near Iguana" in Greek) is an extinct genus of iguanid lizard from the Late Cretaceous of western North America. It is known from a single type species, Pariguana lancensis, named in 2012 on the basis of a partial lower jaw from the Lance Formation in eastern Wyoming. This jaw bone comes from a layer dated approximately 650,000 years before the Cretaceous–Paleogene extinction event. Pariguana is the oldest definitive iguanid from North America, and may represent the first stage of the iguanian evolutionary radiation from Asia into North America.

References

Cretaceous lizards
Iguanidae
Late Cretaceous lepidosaurs of North America
Fossil taxa described in 2012